

2001 Men's Basketball Cup
The 2001 Men's Basketball Cup was contested by sixteen teams and won by Petro Atlético, thus defending its title. The final was played on May 5, 2001.

Preliminary rounds

Final round

2001 Women's Basketball Cup
The 2001 Women's Basketball Cup was contested by three teams in a round robin system. Primeiro de Agosto was the winner.

Day 1

Day 2

Day 3

Standings

See also
 2001 Angola Basketball Super Cup
 2001 BAI Basket

References

Angola Basketball Cup seasons
Cup